Janina Klassen (born in 1953) is a German musicologist and professor at the Hochschule für Musik Freiburg.

Life and career 
Born in Bad Salzuflen, Klassen studied musicology, German studies, philosophy and Italian in Freiburg im Breisgau, Vienna, Paris, Siena and Kiel. She first worked at Christians Verlag in Hamburg and as a lecturer for music theory. After various engagements and teaching positions as well as freelance work as an author, dramaturge and publisher, she earned her doctorate at the Christian-Albrechts-Universität zu Kiel and her habilitation at the Technische Universität Berlin.

In 1999 she became professor of musicology at the Hochschule für Musik Freiburg and is a member of the Senate there. She has published articles on current music and music concepts, music-historical topics, music language theory and gender issues. In 2009 she wrote an authoritative biography of Clara Schumann.

Prizes 
 Robert Schumann Prize of the City of Zwickau 2019 (together with Ragna Schirmer).

Works

References

External links 

1953 births
Living people
People from Bad Salzuflen
Academic staff of the Hochschule für Musik Freiburg
Women musicologists
20th-century German musicologists
21st-century German musicologists